Bellone was an  32-gun frigate of the French Navy on plans by Léon-Michel Guignace. She took part in the American Revolutionary War in the Indian Ocean with the squadron under Suffren, and later in the French Revolutionary Wars. She was present at the Glorious First of June.

The British Royal Navy captured her in 1798 and commissioned her as HMS Proserpine. She never went to sea and was broken up in 1806.

French service
In January 1780, Bellone received copper sheathing.

Operations off America 
On 2 May 1780, she departed Brest with the 7-ship and 3-frigate Expédition Particulière under Admiral Ternay, escorting 36 transports carrying troops to support the Continental Army in the War of American Independence. The squadron comprised the 80-gun Duc de Bourgogne, under Ternay d'Arsac (admiral) and Médine (flag captain); the 74-gun Neptune, under Sochet Des Touches, and Conquérant, under La Grandière; and the 64-gun Provence under Lombard, Ardent under Bernard de Marigny, Jason under La Clocheterie and Éveillé under Le Gardeur de Tilly, and the frigates Surveillante under Villeneuve Cillart, Amazone under La Pérouse, and Bellone. Amazone, which constituted the vanguard of the fleet, arrived at Boston on 11 June 1780.

Indian Ocean campaign of the American Revolutionary War 
In October 1781, Bellone, under Captain Étienne-François de Cillart de Villeneuve, was off Cape of Good Hope escorting the transports Neker and Sévère. The squadron encountered the 50-gun , which captured the transports and brought them to Saint Helena. Bellone sailed on to Isle de France and reinforced the French squadron under Rear-Admiral Thomas d'Estienne d'Orves.

On 9 February 1782, Estienne d'Orves and Suffren assumed command of the squadron. He re-appointed his captains and gave command of Bellone to Jean André de Pas de Beaulieu.

On 14 February 1782 Bellone captured the sloop  in a single ship action. The French took her into service as the corvette Chasseur.

On 1 March 1782, under Captain de Beaulieu, Bellone returned to Trinquebar from a cruise in the Indian Ocean, where she had captured or destroyed 14 merchantmen. In April 1782, Bellone captured the East Indiaman Cartier, which came from China, and brought her to Batacalo. In June of the same year, she captured a British "both", in the roads of Negapatnam that the French took into service as Negapatnam. The next month Negapatnam was at Pondicherry with the French squadron under Admiral Suffren, but her subsequent disposition is unknown. Around late May, Bellone cut out the snow Raiker, with a cargo of arak, and three smaller ships, near the fort of Nagapattinam.

On 12 August 1782, in the runup to the Battle of Trincomalee, Bellone had her mainmast damaged by a gust of wind and sailed to Batacalo for repairs. En route, she encountered , under Andrew Mitchell. In the ensuing Action of 12 August 1782, Coventry killed or wounded the senior officers of Bellone, which allowed her to make good her escape.

In the wake of the Battle of Trincomalee, Suffren sent Bellone to reconnaitre the harbour of Cuddalore and investigate whether a British attack was imminent.  Bellone returned on 23 September 1782 and could report that everything was quiet at Cuddalore.

In January 1783, she was under Villaret-Joyeuse.

Later career 
On 5 February 1791, under Captain de Méhérenc de Saint Pierre, Bellone departed Brest with Amphitrite, bound for Martinique.

From May to December 1792, she cruised the North Sea, before returning to Brest. On 8 October 1792, her commanding officer, Lieutenant Leprince, committed suicide, and the First Officer, Lieutenant Lafargue, took over. In August 1793, she ran aground at Quibéron, but was successfully refloated.

Bellone took part in the Glorious First of June.

In February 1795, under Lieutenant Anger, she crossed from Bergen to Brest. She took part in the Expédition d'Irlande.

Capture and fate
Under Commander Jacob,  Bellone took part in the  Battle of Tory Island on 12 October 1798. She had 20 killed and 45 wounded in the action.

The Royal Navy hulked her, with Captain William Ferris commanding her from August 1804. Still, although officially "under repair" at Plymouth, she was never more than a hulk. The Navy sold her for breaking up on 27 August 1806.

Citations and references 
Notes

Citations

References
 
 
 
 
  (1671-1870)

External links
 
Naval Database 

Age of Sail frigates of France
Ships built in France
Iphigénie-class frigates
1778 ships
Captured ships